Epidendrum subsect. Racemosa is a subsection of section E. sect. Planifolia of subgenus E. subg. Epidendrum of the genus Epidendrum of the Orchidaceae (orchid family). Plants of Racemosa differ from the other subsections of E. sect. Planifolia by producing inflorescences which are racemes. In 1861, Reichenbach recognized 26 species in this subsection.  These names correspond to 25 species currently recognized in the World Checklist of Selected Plant Families (page numbers refer to Reichenbach 1861):

 E. acuminatum Ruiz & Pav.(1798) (p. 408) 
 E. angustissimum Lindl. (1853) (p. 407) 
 E. arbuscula Lindl. (1842) (p. 410) 
 E. cardioglossum Rchb.f. (1850) (p. 407) 
 E. cernuum Kunth (1816) (p. 409) 
 E. chioneum Lindl. (1845) (p. 409) 
 E. fimbriatum Kunth (1816) (p. 406) 
 E. gastropodium Rchb.f. (1862)(p. 405)  
 E. globiflorum F.Lelun & Kraenzl (1899) as E. coccineum Rchb.f.(1855) nom. illeg. (p. 405) 
 E. incomptum Rchb.f. (1853) (p. 410) 
 E. insectiferum Lindl. (1853) (p. 409) 
 E. jamaicense Lindl. (1853) (p. 404-405) 
 E. longipetalum A.Rich & Galeotti (1845) (p. 407) 
 E. magnoliae Muhl. (1813) as E. conopseum  R.Br. (1813)  (p. 408) 
 E. orgyale Lindl. (1845) (p. 406) 
 E. philippii Rchb.f. (1850) (p. 405—406) 
 E. propinquum A.Rich. & Galeotti (1845) (p. 405).  also listed as E. ledifolium A.Rich. & Galeotti (1845) (p. 405) .
 E. quadrangulatum A.D.Hawkes (1957) as E. quadratum Lindl. (1853) nom. illeg.  (p. 406) 
 E. sarcostalix Rchb.f. & Warsz. (1854)  (p. 406) 
 E. steyermarkii A.D. Hawkes (1957) as E matutinum Rchb.f. (1850) nom. illeg.  (p. 409) 
 E. scabrum Ruiz & Pav. (1798) (p. 408)
 E. tenue Lindl. (1841) (p. 407) 
 E. torquatum Lindl. (1845) (p. 408-409) 
 E. vernixium Rchb.f. & Warsz. (1854) (pp. 407–408) 
 E. veroscriptum Hágsater (1993) as E. scriptum A.Rich. & Galeotti (1845) nom. illeg. (p. 407)

References

 
Plant subsections